Scoparia bifaria is a moth in the family Crambidae. It was described by Wei-Chun Li, Hou-Hun Li and Matthias Nuss in 2010. It is found in the Chinese provinces of Guizhou, Gansu and Hubei.

The length of the forewings is 8–10 mm. The forewings are covered with sparse pale brown scales. The antemedian and postmedian lines are white. The hindwings are greyish white.

Etymology
The species name refers to the two rows of cornuti in the male genitalia and is derived from Latin bifarius (meaning two rows of).

References

Moths described in 2010
Scorparia